Croak may refer to:

 Croak, the sound that frogs make

People with the surname
 Alex Croak (born 1984), Australian athlete
 James Croak (born 1951), American visual artist
 John Croak (1892–1918), Canadian soldier
 Marian Croak (born 1955), American engineer

See also
 
 
 Croaker (disambiguation)
 Ribbit (disambiguation)